Drasteria hudsonica, the northern arches, is a moth of the family Erebidae. The species was first described by Augustus Radcliffe Grote and Coleman Townsend Robinson in 1865. It is found from Alaska and Yukon to California, east to New Mexico and Manitoba.

The wingspan is 35–36 mm. Adults are on wing in June in the north. The flight period is earlier southward.

The larvae feed on Shepherdia canadensis.

Subspecies
Drasteria hudsonica hudsonica
Drasteria hudsonica heathi (Barnes & McDunnough, 1918)
Drasteria hudsonica seposita (Edwards, 1881) (Colorado, Utah)

References

External links

Drasteria
Moths of North America
Moths described in 1865